Sukte may refer to:
Sukte people
Sukte language